Simon Turney, born in Ripon, UK, is an English historical novelist with releases centered around Antiquity and Roman Times, the Knights Templar, and the early Ottoman Empire, writing often under the pseudonym SJA Turney.

Biography
Simon worked in a variety of fields before returning to university to complete an honours degree in classical history through the Open University In his spare time, he wrote the first Marius' Mules novel, a tale based upon the Gallic Wars of Julius Caesar, and with it enjoyed initial self-published success  before moving into mainstream releases. A former re-enactor with the Deva Victrix Roman group in Chester, Simon is also a Roman historian and public speaker on the classical world, with a biography of the general Gnaeus Julius Agricola due for release in 2021. Now, with in excess of 40 novels, Simon is a prolific author, spanning such genres as historical fantasy, historical mysteries and historical biography, as well as releasing novels both independently and through publishers like Canelo and Orion Publishing Group. Simon writes full-time and is represented by MMB Literary Agency. He lives with his wife, children, rabbits and dog in rural North Yorkshire.

Bibliography

Series as "S J A Turney"

Marius' Mules 

 The Conquest of Gaul aka The Invasion of Gaul (2009)
 The Belgae (2010)
 Gallia Invicta (2011)
 Conspiracy of Eagles (2012)
 Hades' Gate (2013)
 Caesar's Vow (2014)
 Prelude to War (2014)
 The Great Revolt (2014)
 Sons of Taranis (2015)
 Pax Gallica (2016)
 Fields of Mars (2017)
 Tides of War (2018)
 Sands of Egypt (2019)
 Civil War (2020)

Tales of the Empire
Emperor's Bane (2016)
Interregnum (2009)
Ironroot (2010)
Dark Empress (2011)
Insurgency (2016)
Invasion (2017)
Jade Empire (2017)

Ottoman Cycle
The Thief's Tale (2013)
The Priest's Tale (2013)
The Assassin's Tale (2014)
The Pasha's Tale (2015)

Praetorian
The Great Game (2015)
The Price of Treason (2015)
Eagles of Dacia (2017)
Lions of Rome (2019)
The Cleansing Fire (2020)
Blades of Antioch (2021)

Roman Adventure
Crocodile Legion (2016)
Pirate Legion (2017)

Knights Templar
Daughter of War (2018)
The Last Emir (2018)
City of God (2019)
The Winter Knight (2019)
The Crescent and the Cross (2020)

Wolves of Odin
Blood Feud (2022)
The Bear of Byzantium (2022)

Series as "Simon Turney"

Damned Emperors
Caligula (2018)
Commodus (2019)

Rise of Emperors (with Gordon Doherty)
Sons of Rome (2020)
Masters of Rome (2021)

Novels
A Year of Ravens (2015) (with Ruth Downie, Stephanie Dray, E Knight, Kate Quinn, Vicky Alvear Shecter and Russell Whitfield)
A Song of War (2016) (with Christian Cameron, Libbie Hawker, Kate Quinn, Vicky Alvear Shecter, Stephanie Thornton and Russell Whitfield)

References

External links
 Author's official website

Living people
English historical novelists
21st-century English novelists
Writers of historical fiction set in antiquity
Writers of historical fiction set in the Middle Ages
English male novelists
Year of birth missing (living people)